Polysphenodon is an extinct genus of clevosaurine reptile from the Late Triassic Keuper Group of Germany, discovered within a borehole at  below the surface. The type species, P. mulleri, was described by Otto Jaekel in 1911. The limbs of Polysphenodon are long relative to the size of the skull and are similar in proportions to some species of Homoeosaurus. This resemblance is considered to be indicative of similar locomotory requirements rather than close evolutionary relationships.

References

Triassic reptiles of Europe
Triassic lepidosaurs
Sphenodontia
Middle Triassic first appearances
Late Triassic extinctions
Prehistoric reptile genera